Joanne Muggeridge (born 3 April 1969) is a female badminton player, born in London who represented Great Britain, England and Wales.

Badminton career
She competed in women's singles at the 1992 Summer Olympics in Barcelona, and in women's singles, women's doubles and mixed doubles at the 1996 Summer Olympics in Atlanta. She represented England and won two gold medals in the women's doubles and mixed team events, at the 1994 Commonwealth Games in Victoria, British Columbia, Canada.

Following an argument in 1997 with the England team manager Steve Baddeley she switched allegiance to Wales and competed in the 2002 Commonwealth Games for Wales.

References

External links

English female badminton players
Welsh female badminton players
Olympic badminton players of Great Britain
Badminton players at the 1992 Summer Olympics
Badminton players at the 1996 Summer Olympics
Badminton players at the 1994 Commonwealth Games
Badminton players at the 2002 Commonwealth Games
Commonwealth Games gold medallists for England
Commonwealth Games medallists in badminton
1969 births
Living people
Medallists at the 1994 Commonwealth Games